Paul Michael Layton (born 8 November 1986) is an Australian actor, writer, producer and director. He is known for his lead role in seasons 3–8 of The Horizon, in which he played Jake.

Background 
Paul Michael Layton was born in Sydney, Australia, on 8 November 1986. He studied at The Australian Academy of Dramatic Arts.

Career 
Layton started out in theatre, with many of his performances being in roles at the Pilgrim Theatre in Sydney. He later moved into TV and film, with roles in short films, like My Thoughts Exactly, and various TV series. In 2013, he was cast in the lead role of popular web series, The Horizon, and performed alongside David Collins (Umbilical Brothers) in The Detectives of Noir Town.

In more recent years, Layton took on the role of writer and producer in 25 Frames and The Detectives of Noir Town, winning an award for The Detectives of Noir Town at the Connect Film Festival AUS in 2015. Layton began his directing career in 2018 with The Oxford Circus, which he also produced and starred in.

Filmography

Actor

Producer and Writer

Director

Awards and nominations

References 

1986 births
21st-century Australian male actors
21st-century Australian male writers
Australian directors
Australian Institute of Music alumni
Australian television producers
Living people
Male actors from Sydney